Se las Voy a Dar a Otro is the fifth major label studio album by Regional Mexican singer Jenni Rivera, released by Fonovisa on December 5, 2001. Se las Voy a Dar a Otro earned Rivera a nomination for Best Banda Album at the 3rd Annual Latin Grammy Awards.

Track listing

References

External links 

2001 albums
Fonovisa Records albums
Jenni Rivera albums